Children of Their City is a 1962 novel by Swedish author Per Anders Fogelström. It is the second novel of the City novels.

References

1962 Swedish novels
Swedish-language novels
Novels set in Stockholm
Family saga novels